George Christopher Vance (born 30 December 1971) is an English actor who is known for his television roles as Jack Gallagher in the Fox series Mental (2009), and James Whistler in Prison Break (2007–2008). He played Frank Martin (in TNT's Transporter: The Series) and has recurred on Burn Notice, Dexter, Rizzoli & Isles, Supergirl, and, as Commander Harry Langford, on Hawaii Five-0. He has a recurring role as Dalton Walsh on Amazon Prime Video's Bosch.

Early life
Vance was born in Paddington, Central London, one of four children of Irish parents. He attended St Bede's Secondary School in Lawrence Weston, Bristol, and played youth football for West Bromwich Albion and Bristol Rovers. He then attended Newcastle University, graduating with an honours degree in civil engineering.

Personal life
Vance has been married to Ramona Vance since 2017. He has a son, William, from a previous relationship.

Career
Vance began his acting career at the age of 25 appearing in stage productions, initially in repertory theatre before appearing in Patrick Marber's play Closer and David Edgar's play Albert Speer, both at the Royal National Theatre, the latter being directed by Trevor Nunn. He then made guest appearances in British television series including Kavanagh QC, Peak Practice, The Bill and Doctors.

In 2002, Vance moved to Australia and appeared in the Australian television series Stingers and Blue Heelers, before achieving success in the role of Sean Everleigh in All Saints. In 2007, he moved to the United States and appeared in the third and fourth seasons of Prison Break, portraying James Whistler.

In June 2008, Vance moved to Colombia in order to film the Fox series Mental, but the show was cancelled after 13 episodes. He guest–starred in an antagonistic role as Mason Gilroy on the USA Network series Burn Notice for five episodes toward the end of season 3. Vance also appeared on Showtime series' fifth season of Dexter as Cole, chief of security for a popular motivational speaker who becomes implicated in a series of heinous female torture-murders in Southern Florida. From 2012, he has starred in Transporter: The Series, a French-Canadian production.

Filmography

Film

Television

References

External links

 

1971 births
20th-century English male actors
21st-century English male actors
Alumni of Newcastle University
British expatriate male actors in the United States
English expatriates in the United States
English male film actors
English male stage actors
English male television actors
English people of Irish descent
Living people
Male actors from London
People from Paddington